Christopher Jones (born 5 March 1987) is a British acrobatic gymnast that represented Great Britain, achieving a bronze medal in the men's pairs discipline at the World Games in 2005, and a further bronze at the European Acrobatic Gymmnastics Championships, both in partnership with Mark Fyson.

References
 

1987 births
Living people
British acrobatic gymnasts
Male acrobatic gymnasts
World Games bronze medalists
Competitors at the 2005 World Games
21st-century British people